Buday (literally "from Buda"), is the Magyar surname of several people:
 Dénes von Buday (1890-1963), Hungarian composer 
 Attila Buday (born 1974), Canadian flatwater canoeist
 Ferenc Buday (born 1951), Hungarian handball player
 Gölök Z Buday (born 1978) Vancouver Mayoral Candidate, MindFreedom and Freespeech Advocate, Comedian/Entertainer (The Black Jester).
 Helen Buday (born 1962), Australian actress
 John M. Buday US Neuroscientist
 Laszlo Buday Hungarian Artist and Coppersmith (Florida and Ontario)
 Lynne Marie Buday (born 1957) Judge
 Tamas Buday Jr. (born 1976), Canadian flatwater canoeist
 Zoltán Buday (born 1952), Hungarian-Canadian actor

See also 
 Buda

Hungarian-language surnames